"One Love at a Time" is a song written by Paul Davis and Paul Overstreet, and recorded by American country music artist Tanya Tucker.  It was released in February 1986 as the first single from the album Girls Like Me.  The song reached #3 on the Billboard Hot Country Singles & Tracks chart.

Chart performance

References

1986 singles
1986 songs
Tanya Tucker songs
Songs written by Paul Davis (singer)
Songs written by Paul Overstreet
Capitol Records Nashville singles
Song recordings produced by Jerry Crutchfield